Gregory David Clark (born 28 August 1967) is a British politician who served as Secretary of State for Levelling Up, Housing and Communities from 7 July 2022 to 6 September 2022. A member of the Conservative Party, he has served as Member of Parliament (MP) for Tunbridge Wells since 2005. He is currently the Chair of the Science and Technology Select Committee.

Clark was born in Middlesbrough and studied Economics at Magdalene College, Cambridge, where he was president of Cambridge University Social Democrats. He then gained his PhD from the London School of Economics. Clark worked as a business consultant before becoming the BBC's Controller for Commercial Policy and then Director of Policy for the Conservative Party under Conservative leaders Iain Duncan Smith and Michael Howard from 2001 until his election to parliament in 2005.

Clark served in the Cameron-Clegg coalition as Minister of State in the Department for Communities and Local Government from 2010 to 2012, Financial Secretary to the Treasury from 2012 to 2013, and Minister of State for Cities and Constitution at the Cabinet Office from 2013 to 2014. Between July 2014 and May 2015, he held the post of Minister for Universities, Science and Cities. Following  the 2015 general election, Prime Minister David Cameron promoted Clark to the Cabinet as Secretary of State for Communities and Local Government. In July 2016, he was appointed as Secretary of State for Business, Energy and Industrial Strategy by new Prime Minister Theresa May and remained in that role until 24 July 2019. He had the whip removed on 3 September 2019, for voting against the government, before it was restored on 29 October. In May 2022, he was named as the Prime Ministers' trade envoy to Japan by Boris Johnson.

He has been described as an "economically liberal Conservative with a social conscience".

Early life
Clark was born in Middlesbrough and attended St Peter's Roman Catholic School in South Bank. His father and grandfather were milkmen running the family business, John Clark and Sons, while his mother worked at Sainsbury's.

Clark read Economics at Magdalene College, Cambridge. He joined the Social Democratic Party (SDP) while at Cambridge and was an executive member of its national student wing, Social Democrat Youth and Students (SDYS) and, in 1987,  president of Cambridge University Social Democrats. He then studied at the London School of Economics, where he was awarded his PhD in 1992 with a thesis entitled, The effectiveness of incentive payment systems: an empirical test of individualism as a boundary condition.

Career
Clark first worked as a business consultant for Boston Consulting Group, before becoming special advisor to the Secretary of State for Trade and Industry, Ian Lang, between 1996 and 1997. Subsequently, he was appointed the BBC's Controller, Commercial Policy, and was Director of Policy for the Conservative Party from 2001 until his election to parliament in May 2005. Between 2002 and 2005, he was also a councillor on Westminster City Council, representing Warwick ward and serving as Cabinet Member for Leisure and Lifelong Learning.

Member of Parliament
Clark was selected as the Conservative prospective parliamentary candidate for Tunbridge Wells in December 2004. Clark was elected at the 2005 general election for the parliamentary constituency of Tunbridge Wells, after Archie Norman stood down as the MP.

He was elected with a majority of 9,988, and made his maiden speech on 9 June 2005, in which he spoke of the (then) forthcoming 400th anniversary of Dudley, Lord North's discovery of the Chalybeate spring and the foundation of Royal Tunbridge Wells, a town to which the royal prefix was added in 1909 by King Edward VII. He also noted with pride that Royal Tunbridge Wells had elected the country's first Jewish Member of Parliament.

Shadow Cabinet
Clark was appointed to the front bench, in a minor reshuffle in November 2006 by David Cameron, becoming Shadow Minister for Charities, Voluntary Bodies and Social Enterprise.  Shortly after his appointment he made headlines by saying the Conservative party needed to pay less attention to the social thinking of Winston Churchill, and more to that of columnist on The Guardian, Polly Toynbee.

In October 2007, Clark campaigned to save Tunbridge Wells Homeopathic Hospital. In October 2008, Clark was promoted to the Shadow Cabinet, shadowing the new government position of Secretary of State for Energy and Climate Change.  A spokesperson for West Kent PCT said 39 major studies had been made of homeopathy but there was "no clear evidence that it worked"

Minister of State for Decentralisation
Clark was appointed a Minister of State in the Department for Communities and Local Government from May 2010, with responsibility for overseeing decentralisation, a key policy of the Liberal Democrat-Conservative coalition. In this role he called for the churches and other faith communities to send him their ideas for new social innovations for all, and made a major speech on "turning government upside down" jointly to the think tanks CentreForum and Policy Exchange. He was accused of hypocrisy, having staunchly opposed house-building while in opposition, while threatening to impose it as a government minister.

However, since announcing the National Planning Policy Framework (NPPF) he has been praised by heritage NGOs and Simon Jenkins of the National Trust.

In July 2011 he was appointed Minister for Cities. In this role he tried to promote the urban economies of the North, West and Midlands.

In November 2015, in his capacity of Secretary of State for Communities and Local Government, Clark called in the decision making power in the appeal against the Lancashire County Council's decision regarding a shale gas fracking application made by Cuadrilla Resources.

Financial Secretary to the Treasury
In a cabinet reshuffle in September 2012, Clark was appointed Financial Secretary to the Treasury with responsibility for financial services, known informally as the City Minister, he retained the ministerial brief responsible for cities policy.

Minister for Universities, Science and Cities
On 15 July 2014 Clark was appointed to the role of Minister for Universities, Science and Cities, replacing David Willetts who was generally praised for his service in the post. The new portfolio combined the universities and science brief held by Willetts with the cities policy already handled by Clark.

His appointment was met with concerns about securing future funding for universities and questions over his public support for homoeopathic treatments.

Secretary of State for Communities and Local Government
Clark returned to the Department of Communities and Local Government as Secretary of State on 11 May 2015, appointed in David Cameron's first cabinet reshuffle following the 2015 general election.

Secretary of State for Business, Energy and Industrial Strategy

Clark was appointed Secretary of State for Business, Energy and Industrial Strategy on 14 July 2016, in Theresa May's first cabinet. In October 2016, he appointed his predecessor as MP, Archie Norman, as Lead Non Executive Board Member for the Department for Business, Energy and Industrial Strategy.

In February 2017, Clark travelled to Paris, in order to meet executives from Peugeot and the French Government, due to the proposed takeover of Vauxhall Motors.

In May 2018, Clark suggested that 3,500 UK domestic jobs could be lost as a direct and explicit result of Brexit. Brexiteers, such as Jacob Rees-Mogg said this was a "revival of project fear". Clark argued in response that the job losses were 'substantiated' in the result of an inadequate customs union deal with the European Union, but stated that this did not include the transition/implementation period.

Clark opposed a no deal Brexit. In September 2018, Clark said, "People in good jobs up and down the country are looking to our national leaders to make sure a deal is approved. We are one of the world's leaders in the next generation of automotive technology. To see that slip through our fingers is something we would regret forever."

In January 2019, Clark, against the advice of Theresa May, suggested he might resign from Cabinet in the event of the United Kingdom not securing a deal with the European Union in Brexit negotiations. At the time he was the most senior minister to do so.

On 6 February 2019, Clark said to the Business, Energy and Industrial Strategy Committee that Theresa May had until 15 February to conclude Brexit negotiations in order to provide certainty to exporters to countries such as Japan because of the length of time that goods take to arrive. The EU-Japan free trade agreement would no longer apply to the UK in the event of a no-deal Brexit.

Under the tenure of Clark, who was responsible for workers' rights nationally, his department in London reportedly did not ensure that its staff, many of whom had been outsourced, were paid at least the London living wage. In February 2019, the staff went on strike for 26 hours.

Removal and restoration of Conservative whip 

On 3 September 2019 Clark voted against the government on taking control of the House of Commons order paper to allow a bill to be debated in parliament which would stop a no-deal Brexit without explicit approval of parliament. He became an independent as the Conservative whip was withdrawn from him. On 29 October, the whip was restored to 10 former Conservative ministers, including Clark.

Personal life
Clark and his wife Helen have three children, two girls and a boy. They live in Royal Tunbridge Wells. He is a member of the Roman Catholic church.

Notes

References

External links
Greg Clark MP official constituency website
Profile at the Ministry for Communities and Local Government
Profile at the Conservative Party

News articles
 Garden grabbing Bill in October 2006
 His influence on policies in October 2002

Video clips
 Discovering poverty

|-

|-

|-

|-

|-

|-

|-

|-

|-

|-

|-

Living people
1967 births
Alumni of Magdalene College, Cambridge
Alumni of the London School of Economics
British Secretaries of State
Presidents of the Board of Trade
Members of the Privy Council of the United Kingdom
Ministers for Universities (United Kingdom)
Conservative Party (UK) MPs for English constituencies
Independent members of the House of Commons of the United Kingdom
People from Middlesbrough
People from Royal Tunbridge Wells
Politics of the Borough of Tunbridge Wells
Social Democratic Party (UK) politicians
UK MPs 2005–2010
UK MPs 2010–2015
UK MPs 2015–2017
UK MPs 2017–2019
UK MPs 2019–present
Conservative Party (UK) councillors
Councillors in the City of Westminster